Zdzisław Kumiszcze (31 March 1937 – 5 October 1986) was a Polish hurdler. He competed in the men's 400 metres hurdles at the 1960 Summer Olympics.

References

1937 births
1986 deaths
Athletes (track and field) at the 1960 Summer Olympics
Polish male hurdlers
Olympic athletes of Poland
Place of birth missing
Zawisza Bydgoszcz athletes
20th-century Polish people